Zurqes (also, Aşağı Çiçəkli and Zurges) is a village in the Goygol Rayon of Azerbaijan.

References 

Populated places in Goygol District